John W. Hubbell is an American bridge player.

Bridge accomplishments

Wins

 North American Bridge Championships (4)
 Spingold (2) 1953, 1954 
 Wernher Open Pairs (1) 1957 
 von Zedtwitz Life Master Pairs (1) 1954

Runners-up

 North American Bridge Championships (1)
 Spingold (1) 1962

Notes

American contract bridge players